Oscuro animal is a 2016 Colombian drama film directed by Felipe Guerrero. The film was named on the shortlist for Colombia's entry for the Academy Award for Best Foreign Language Film at the 89th Academy Awards, but it was not selected.

Plot
Three women must escape from the jungle to the city to get away from the war that plagues the rural territories of Colombia. They arrive in Bogota to try to restart their lives, in an environment that is completely alien to their reality and customs.

Cast
 Marleyda Soto as Rocío
 Luisa Vides Galiano as Nelsa
 Jocelyn Menendez as La Mona
 Josué Quiñones como Reyes.

References

External links
 

2016 films
2016 drama films
Colombian drama films
2010s Spanish-language films
2010s Colombian films
Films set in Bogotá